City of York Council is the municipal governing body of the City of York, a unitary authority in Yorkshire, England. It is composed of 47 councillors, one, two, or three for each of the 21 electoral wards of York. It is responsible for all local government services in the City of York, except for services provided by York's town and parish councils.

History

Municipal borough
The ancient liberty of the City of York was replaced in 1836 by a municipal borough, with city status, as a result of the Municipal Corporations Act 1835. As a municipal borough, the York Corporation was responsible for all local government services in the City of York. The municipal borough was expanded to serve the following areas:

County borough
The municipal borough was replaced in 1884 by a county borough, with city status, as a result of the Municipal Corporations Act 1882. As a county borough, the York Corporation was responsible for all local government services in the City of York. When county councils were established for the East Riding, North Riding, and West Riding in 1889, as a result of the Local Government Act 1888, the City of York remained outside of their jurisdiction. The county borough was expanded and reduced in size to serve the following areas:

Non-metropolitan district
The county borough was replaced in 1974 by a non-metropolitan district, with city status, as a result of the Local Government Act 1972. As a non-metropolitan district, York City Council was responsible for some local government services in the City of York, with others being the responsibility of North Yorkshire County Council. The non-metropolitan district served the same area as the county borough:

Unitary authority
The non-metropolitan district was replaced in 1996 by a unitary authority, with city status, as a result of the Local Government Act 1992. As a unitary authority, City of York Council is responsible for all local government services in the City of York, except for services provided by York's town and parish councils. The unitary authority serves the following areas:

In October 2020, the UK government invited proposals for reform of local government in North Yorkshire, including the City of York.  The districts of Craven, Harrogate, Richmondshire, Ryedale, Scarborough and Selby submitted a proposal for an "East & West model" of two unitary councils in North Yorkshire, including the City of York. The two new councils would cover Ryedale, Scarborough, Selby and York in the east, and Craven, Hambleton, Harrogate and Richmondshire in the west.  The City of York Council submitted an alternative proposal to retain its existing status, and supported a proposal by North Yorkshire County Council for a single unitary authority for North Yorkshire (excluding the City of York).  In July 2021, local government minister Robert Jenrick approved the alternative proposal.

Under the new arrangements the two councils proposed to form a combined authority for York and North Yorkshire.  In August 2022 the government and the two councils agreed proposals for a devolution deal, which will require the formation of a combined authority and election of a directly elected mayor for the combined authority.  The proposals are subject to a public consultation, and anticipate that elections for the first mayor would take place in May 2024.

Political control
See City of York Council elections for historic elections, political control and leadership.

Since 2015 the council has been under no overall control. The leader of the council since 2019 has been Keith Aspden, a Liberal Democrat.

2015–2019
Conservatives and Liberal Democrats, holding 26 of the 47 seats, formed a joint administration to run the council in May 2015. Both parties are opposed to green belt development on the scale proposed by the Labour Party. The working majority of the joint administration shrunk in February 2018 to 24 seats, when former council leader David Carr (Copmanthorpe Ward) and Suzie Mercer (Wheldrake Ward) quit the Conservative group and party, Labour councillors Fiona Derbyshire and Hilary Shepherd resigned from the Labour Party in August to sit as Independent Socialists York.

2019–present
Due to no overall control, the Liberal Democrats and the Green Party, who hold 25 of the 47 seats between them, joined forces to form a coalition to run the City of York Council, revealed by YorkMix on 14 May 2019. Support for the Liberal Democrats and Green Party in York increased at the poll. Both parties combined received more than 50% of the vote.

Lender option borrower option loans
The council has two lender option borrower option loans (LOBOs) worth £5 million. Each run until 2060 and 2077, with current interest rates of 3.66 percent and 3.8 percent. One of the loans was taken out in 2008, on a 69-year term, and the other in 2010, on a 50-year term.

Social care
In October 2020 the council provided older people in the city with smart watches, which monitor a range of indicators including body temperature, heart rate, sleep patterns and step count. They are supported by sensors in their homes that can capture temperature and humidity, movement, how often doors open and close and power consumption.  The service is provided by Sensing247 and North SP Group Limited and is intended to help people stay independent.

References

External links

City of York Council official website

Unitary authority councils of England
Local authorities in North Yorkshire
Local education authorities in England
Billing authorities in England
Leader and cabinet executives
Council